Edward Louis Shaughnessy (born July 29, 1952) is an American Sinologist, scholar, and educator, known for his studies of early Chinese history, particularly the Zhou dynasty, and his studies of the Classic of Changes (I Ching 易經).

Life and career
Edward Shaughnessy was born on July 29, 1952.  He attended the University of Notre Dame as an undergraduate student, graduating in 1974 with a B.A. in theology, after which he spent several years studying Chinese in Taiwan and Japanese in Kyoto, Japan.  He then went to Stanford University for graduate study in Asian languages, earning his Ph.D. in 1983 with a dissertation entitled "The Composition of the Zhouyi". After receiving his Ph.D., Shaughnessy joined the faculty of the Department of East Asian Languages and Civilizations at the University of Chicago, where he is currently the Lorraine J. and Herrlee G. Creel Distinguished Service Professor of Early Chinese Studies.

Shaughnessy's wife, Elena Valussi, is an Italian scholar of East Asian history who teaches at Loyola University Chicago.  They have two children.

Selected works
 Shaughnessy, Edward L. (1983). "The Composition of the Zhouyi".  Ph.D. dissertation (Stanford University).
 
 
 
 
 
 ———, ed. (1997).  New Sources of Early Chinese History: An Introduction to the Reading of Inscriptions and Manuscripts.  Early China Monograph Series 3.  Berkeley: Society for the Study of Early China; Institute for East Asian Studies, University of California Berkeley. 
 ———; Loewe, Michael, eds. (1999).  The Cambridge History of Ancient China.  Cambridge: Cambridge University Press. 
 ———, ed. (2005). China: Empire and Civilization. Oxford: Oxford University Press.

References

External links
Biography of Shaughnessy, University of Chicago website.

1952 births
Living people
American sinologists
University of Notre Dame alumni
Stanford University alumni
University of Chicago faculty